The Nokia 5320 XpressMusic  is a Symbian OS S60 smartphone, released by Nokia in 2008 as a part of their XpressMusic line of portable devices. The phone has a rugged candybar body with outlined keypads. It emphasizes music and multimedia playback. Among its highlights are a dedicated 3D audio chip for better sound quality, 24 hours of music playback, a 3.5 mm audio jack, N-Gage compatibility, and music/gaming keys. At the time of release the phone cost $220 in the U.S., European and Asian markets.

Its capabilities include: a 2-megapixel digital camera with flash, video recording and video conferencing; wireless connectivity via HSDPA, and Bluetooth; a portable media player with the ability to download podcasts over the air; an FM radio tuner; multitasking to allow several applications to run simultaneously; a web browser with support for HTML, JavaScript and Adobe Flash; messaging via SMS, MMS and e-mail; Office suite and organizer functions; and the ability to install and run third-party Java ME or Symbian mobile applications.

References

External links 
 Official Nokia Europe 5320 product page
 Listing on gsmarena.com
 Review on allaboutsymbian.com

Mobile phones introduced in 2008
Nokia smartphones
Portable media players
Symbian devices